Bernd Krauss (born 8 May 1957) is a German-Austrian retired football player and manager.

His most recent spell he had as technical director and head coach of Tunisian club Étoile Sportive du Sahel in 2012.

Club career
Born in Dortmund, Krauss started his professional career at local outfit Borussia Dortmund but limited chances there made him move to Austrian Bundesliga side Rapid Wien in 1977. The move proved to be successful, winning the league title (twice) and the domestic cup. He only returned to Germany in 1983 to join Borussia Mönchengladbach where he finished his playing career and took up a coaching post.

International career
The German-born Krauss was tempted to become an Austrian citizen when playing at Rapid Wien and joined Austria's national team set-up. He made his debut for Austria in 1981 and was a participant at the 1982 FIFA World Cup. He earned 22 caps, no goals scored – however, he did score an own goal against West Germany in a game on 29 April 1981 that ended in a 2–0 loss. He already played his final international match in 1984, after he left Austria to play in his native West Germany again.

Coaching career
Krauss started his coaching career at the German club SC Kapellen (1988–89), before he was called up to manage the amateur teams of Borussia Mönchengladbach (1989–90) and 1. FC Köln (1990). In 1991, he became the assistant coach at Mönchengladbach, and then from 6 November 1992 to 7 December 1996 he was the appointed head coach of the club. In 1995, he achieved great success in winning the DFB-Pokal.

The late 90s were the most successful years in the coaching era of Bernd Krauss. 1997–1999 he managed the Spanish first-division team of Real Sociedad. In 2000, he shortly came back to Germany to take over Borussia Dortmund, succeeding Michael Skibbe. It turned out to be a big mistake, as he was sacked after two months. Krauss then got back to Spain, where he coached RCD Mallorca (2001).

In the next few years Krauss became a globetrotter, managing teams in Greece (Aris Thessaloniki, 2002), Austria (VfB Admira Wacker Mödling, 2004), United Arab Emirates and Iran (Pegah Gilan, 2005). From April to December 2006 he return to Spain, where he managed CD Tenerife.

In August 2007 he was appointed manager of Austrian SK Schwadorf, replacing Attila Sekerlioglu. On 6 December the same year he was fired, placing only one point ahead of the relegation zone in the Austrian Second Division.

In January 2012, Krauss was appointed general manager of Tunesian Étoile Sportive du Sahel then the head coach of the same team. In March 2012, he reportedly returned to his initial position of youth technical director as Faouzi Benzarti took up the post of the head coach of Étoile. However, he denied the change of positions and left the club.

Honours

Player
 Austrian Bundesliga: 1981–82, 1982–83
 Austrian Cup: 1983

Coach
 DFB-Pokal: 1994–95

References

External links
 Bernd Krauss at Rapid Archiv 
 
 Bernd Krauss at Fussballportal 

1957 births
Living people
Footballers from Dortmund
German footballers
Austrian footballers
Association football defenders
Austria international footballers
1982 FIFA World Cup players
Borussia Dortmund players
SK Rapid Wien players
Borussia Mönchengladbach players
Bundesliga players
Austrian Football Bundesliga players
German football managers
Borussia Mönchengladbach managers
Real Sociedad managers
Borussia Dortmund managers
RCD Mallorca managers
Aris Thessaloniki F.C. managers
Bundesliga managers
FC Admira Wacker Mödling managers
Baniyas SC managers
CD Tenerife managers
Étoile Sportive du Sahel managers
West German expatriate footballers
West German expatriate sportspeople in Austria
Expatriate footballers in Austria
German expatriate football managers
Naturalised citizens of Austria
Expatriate football managers in Germany
Austrian expatriate sportspeople in Spain
Expatriate football managers in Spain
Austrian expatriate sportspeople in Greece
Expatriate football managers in Greece
Expatriate football managers in Iran
Expatriate football managers in Tunisia
Expatriate football managers in the United Arab Emirates
Austrian expatriate sportspeople in Tunisia
West German footballers
West German football managers
German expatriate sportspeople in Greece
German expatriate sportspeople in Spain
German expatriate sportspeople in Tunisia
German expatriate sportspeople in the United Arab Emirates
Austrian expatriate sportspeople in the United Arab Emirates
Austrian expatriate sportspeople in Iran
German expatriate sportspeople in Iran